Orrin Holt (March 13, 1792 – June 20, 1855) was a United States representative from Connecticut.  He was born in Willington, Connecticut. He received a limited schooling and engaged in agricultural pursuits. He was a member of the Connecticut State House of Representatives 1830–1832. He then served in the Connecticut Senate in 1835 and 1836.

Holt was elected as a Jacksonian to the Twenty-fourth Congress to fill the vacancy caused by the resignation of Andrew T. Judson. He was reelected as a Democrat to the Twenty-fifth Congress and served from December 5, 1836, to March 3, 1839. He then resumed agricultural pursuits and was also interested in military organizations of the State of Connecticut and held official ranks up to inspector general. He died in East Willington, Connecticut in 1855 and was buried in Old Cemetery, Willington Hill, Connecticut.

References

1792 births
1855 deaths
People from Willington, Connecticut
Jacksonian members of the United States House of Representatives from Connecticut
19th-century American politicians
Democratic Party members of the United States House of Representatives from Connecticut
Burials in Connecticut